The Penn Quakers football program is the college football team at the University of Pennsylvania in Philadelphia. The Penn Quakers have competed in the Ivy League since its inaugural season of 1956, and are a Division I Football Championship Subdivision (FCS) member of the National Collegiate Athletic Association (NCAA). Penn has played in 1,413 football games, the most of any school in any division. Penn plays its home games at historic Franklin Field, the oldest football stadium in the nation. All Penn games are broadcast on WNTP or WFIL radio.

Overall history

Penn bills itself as "college football's most historic program". The Quakers have had 63 First Team All-Americans, and the college is the alma mater of John Heisman (the namesake of college football's most famous trophy). The team has won a share of 7 national championships (7th all-time) and competed in the "granddaddy of them all" (The Rose Bowl) in 1917. Penn's total of 837 wins puts them 11th all-time in college football (3rd in the FCS) and their winning percentage of 62.9% is 21st in college football (7th in the FCS). 18 members of the College Football Hall of Fame played at Penn (tied with Alabama for 14th) and 5 members of the College Football Hall of Fame coached at Penn. Penn has had 11 unbeaten seasons. Penn plays at the oldest stadium in college football, Franklin Field, at which they have had a 35-game home winning streak (1896–1899), which is the 15th best in the country, and at which they have had 23 unbeaten home seasons. Penn is one of the few college football teams to have had an exclusive contract with a network for broadcasting all their home games. For the 1950 season, ABC Sports broadcast all of Penn's home games. The only other teams to have had exclusive contracts are Miami and Notre Dame. The Quakers competed as a major independent until 1956, when they accepted the invitation to join the Ivy League.  When the Ivy League was reclassified to Division I-AA, today known as FCS, following the 1981 season, Penn moved to Division I-AA play with the rest of the league.

Before the start of the 2020 season, the Ivy League announced that no sports would be played until January 1, 2021, at the earliest, because of the COVID-19 pandemic. The League resumed in September 2021.

NCAA television controversy
See: NCAA Football television controversy
In 1951, the NCAA attempted to stop any live broadcast of college football games during the season, which affected Penn due to them being one of only two colleges to enact this practice (the other being Notre Dame). After public outcry, the NCAA restricted the number of games televised for each team. Penn attempted to circumvent the rules through its contract, but they had to back down due to the NCAA's threat of possibly expelling the Quakers from the association.

Ivy League
Penn joined the Ivy League in 1956 when it was formed. Penn won its 1st Ivy League Football Championship in 1959. It was not until 1982, 23 years later, that Penn would win its 2nd Ivy League Football Championship. Since that year Penn has become a dominant football power in the Ivy League. They are tied with Dartmouth in winning a record 18 Ivy League Football Championships. Penn, however, is first in outright Ivy League titles (13), and first in undefeated Ivy League titles (8).

Championships

National championships
Penn has claimed seven national championships, with selectors declaring them a champion in six of the seven years. The Quakers claim the 1907 season as a championship in their own view. Penn's football fact book states that the Billingsley Report named the 1907 team National Champions, but other sources show Billingsley naming Yale for 1907.

Conference championships
Penn has won 18 conference championships (all of which in the Ivy League), winning 13 outright and five shared.

† Co-champions

NCAA records
NCAA record for most college football games played – 1,413. 
NCAA record for consecutive overtime losses – 3 games

Ivy League records
Most outright Ivy League titles – 13 (1959, 1984, 1985, 1986, 1993, 1994, 1998, 2000, 2002, 2003, 2009, 2010, 2012) ;
Highest number of unbeaten Ivy League seasons – 8 (1984, 1986, 1993, 1994, 2002, 2003, 2009, 2010); 
Longest Ivy League winning streak – 20 straight games (2001–2004). Penn also holds the next two longest Ivy League win streaks: 18 straight games (2008–2011) and 17 straight games (1992–1995).
Record 18 Ivy League Football Championships. Tied with Dartmouth.

Franklin Field

Penn's home stadium Franklin Field is not only the oldest stadium in football but holds many other records as well. It is the site of the oldest stadium scoreboard (1895), the "original horseshoe" (1903), the first college football radio broadcast (1922 on WIP), the first double-decker football stadium (1925), the largest stadium in the country (1925–1926), the first college football television broadcast (1940 on KYW-TV) and the first FCS stadium to host ESPN's College Gameday (2002).

Penn in the AP Poll

Bowl games
Penn has participated in one bowl game, garnering a record of 0–1.

Rivalries

Cornell

The series with Cornell dates to 1876.  Penn leads the series 73–46–5 through the 2017 season.

Harvard
The series with Harvard dates to 1881. Harvard leads the series 48–38–2 through the 2017 season.

Princeton
The series with Princeton dates to 1876. Princeton leads the series 66–42–1 through the 2017 season.

Individual players

Notable Quaker players
 Reds Bagnell – 1950 Maxwell Award winner, All-American, runner up for the Heisman Trophy, College Football Hall of Fame
 Chuck Bednarik – namesake of the Chuck Bednarik Award, 1948 Maxwell Award winner, Pro Football Hall of Fame, College Football Hall of Fame
 Bert Bell – former NFL commissioner, founder, owner & coach of the Philadelphia Eagles, owner of the Pittsburgh Steelers, Pro Football Hall of Fame
 George H. Brooke – Twice All-America, College football Hall of Fame.
 Truxton Hare – Consensus All-American every year he played, College Football Hall of Fame, winner of silver medal in the hammer throw at the 1900 Summer Olympics
 Jim Finn – 1999, New York Giants starting full back in Super Bowl XLII
 John Heisman – namesake of the Heisman Trophy, College Football Hall of Fame
 Florian Kempf – Professional soccer player and NFL kicker for the Houston Oilers and New Orleans Saints
 Alden Knipe – All-America, led team to 1894 national championship.
 Leroy Mercer- All-America, College Football Hall of Fame, Olympic athlete
 Skip Minisi – first-round NFL draft pick, College Football Hall of Fame
 Bob Odell – 1943 Maxwell Award winner, College Football Hall of Fame
 John H. Outland – namesake of the Outland Trophy, College Football Hall of Fame
 George Savitsky – All-American tackle in the 1940s, only four-year All American of the 20th century in College Football, in the College Football Hall of Fame, drafted by Philadelphia Eagles.
 Kevin Stefanski – Head Coach of the Cleveland Browns

Individual award winners
Penn's total of three major award winners surpasses several BCS programs to this day.
Maxwell Award
Bob Odell – 1943
Chuck Bednarik – 1948
Reds Bagnell – 1950

Ivy League Coach of the Year
Jerry Berndt – 1984
Ray Priore – 2015

College Football Hall of Fame
Eighteen former players have been inducted into the College Football Hall of Fame.

Quakers in the NFL Draft

A total of 51 players from Penn have been drafted in the NFL including NFL Hall of Famers Chuck Bednarik (#1 overall pick in 1949) and NFL first-round pick Skip Minisi.

Notable games

Penn 30, Navy 0
On October 18, 1986, Penn defeated Navy 30–0 in front of Navy's Homecoming crowd. Penn finished the season undefeated at 10–0, 7–0 in the Ivy League for their 5th straight Ivy League title.

Penn 35, Harvard 25
On November 14, 2015, Penn defeated 12th ranked Harvard 35–25 at Harvard Stadium. This win ended Harvard's 22-game winning streak; their first loss since October 26, 2013. With this win, Penn improved to 6–3, 5–1 in the Ivy League, and with a 34–21 win in their next and final game against Cornell, were able to clinch a share of the Ivy League title along with Harvard and Dartmouth. The title capped a remarkable comeback season for Penn. After back-to-back losing seasons in 2013 and 2014, Penn started the 2015 season at 1–3, including a loss in their Ivy League opener, but rallied with 6 straight wins to end the season.

Penn 27, Harvard 14
On November 11, 2016, Penn defeated 22nd ranked Harvard at Franklin Field. This win ended Harvard's Ivy record 13-game Ivy road game win streak. With this win, Penn improved to 6–3, 5–1 in the Ivy League, and into a three-way tie atop the Ivy League alongside Harvard and Princeton. Penn scored two touchdowns in the game's final 17 seconds, headlined by an 80-yard touchdown drive engineered by quarterback Alek Torgersen and a last second scoop and score by Tayler Hendrickson. A 42–20 victory the next week against Cornell gave Penn a share of the 2016 Ivy League title, making them back-to-back champions for the first time since 2009–2010. A Harvard loss to Yale in "The Game" the next week dropped the Crimson out of title contention.

Penn 23, Harvard 21
On November 13, 1982, Penn defeated Harvard with no time left on the game clock at Franklin Field. This win clinched a share of the Ivy football title for Penn. While Penn led 20–0 with nine minutes to play, Harvard scored three touchdowns in just eight minutes. However the Quarterback Gary Vura, starting at his own 20-yard line with just a minute and 24 seconds left, marched his team down the field, setting up a field goal attempt by kicker Dave Shulman. Shulman's 38-yard attempt was tipped by a Harvard player and went wide left. But  Harvard was called for roughing the kicker. Since a game cannot end on a potential decision-changing defensive penalty, Shulman kicked again, this time from the 11-yard line and his 27-yard field goal was good. Although the Quakers did lose the following weekend to Cornell, their victory that day, after three losing seasons of 0–9, 1–9 and 1–9, gave Penn a share of the Ivy title for the first time since 1959, which had been its only Ivy title. It also marked the turning point in Penn's Ivy football play, with the Quakers winning or sharing another 16 Ivy titles during the 35 years since then.

References

External links

 

 
American football teams established in 1876
1876 establishments in Pennsylvania